Malcolm Brewster Heath (9 March 1934 - 17 December 2019) was an English first-class cricketer. He was a right-handed batsman who bowled right-arm fast-medium and made his first-class debut for Hampshire County Cricket Club in the 1954 County Championship against Leicestershire.

Heath played for Hampshire in 143 first-class matches from 1954 to 1962, with his final appearance for the county coming in 1962 against Derbyshire at the United Services Recreation Ground at Portsmouth. In his 143 matches for the county, Heath scored 569 runs at a batting average of 5.86, with a high score of 33. Heath, being a bowler, took 527 wickets at a bowling average of 25.11, with 18 five wicket hauls and 5 ten wicket hauls in a match, with best bowling figures of 8/43 against Sussex in 1958. The 1958 season was Heath's best with the ball, during which he took 126 wickets at an average of 16.42, with 10 five wicket hauls and 3 ten wicket hauls in a match. In addition, Heath played an important role in Hampshire's 1961 County Championship winning squad, taking 63 wickets at an average of 26.73, with one five wicket haul of 5-78. Throughout his career, Heath took 42 catches in the field. Heath later represented Scarborough Cricket Club, and had a coaching role at Lord's.

In 1969 Heath made a one-off appearance for the Marylebone Cricket Club in a non first-class match against Ireland at Lord's, taking a single wicket in the match.

Umpiring
Heath was appointed to the first-class umpires list in 1984, during which season he stood in three first-class matches and one List A match between Wiltshire and Leicestershire in the 1984 NatWest Trophy.

References

External links

1934 births
2019 deaths
People from Ferndown
Cricketers from Dorset
English cricketers
Hampshire cricketers
English cricket umpires